Lorenzo Gonnelli (born 28 June 1993) is an Italian footballer who plays as a defender for  club Picerno.

Club career
On 31 January 2020, he joined Alessandria on loan until the end of the season.

On 5 October 2020 he signed a three-year contract with Cesena.

On 24 August 2022, Gonnelli moved to Cerignola.

On 31 January 2023, Gonnelli joined Picerno.

References

External links

1993 births
Living people
Sportspeople from Livorno
Footballers from Tuscany
Italian footballers
Association football defenders
Serie B players
Serie C players
U.S. Città di Pontedera players
U.S. Livorno 1915 players
U.S. Alessandria Calcio 1912 players
Cesena F.C. players
S.S.D. Audace Cerignola players
AZ Picerno players